Cyanomitra is a genus of African sunbirds. Its members are sometimes included in Nectarinia.

The sunbirds are a group of very small Old World passerine birds which feed largely on nectar, although they will also take insects, especially when feeding young. Flight is fast and direct on their short wings. Most species can take nectar by hovering like a hummingbird, but usually perch to feed most of the time.

Taxonomy
The genus Cyanomitra was introduced in 1853 by the German naturalist Ludwig Reichenbach. The name combines the Ancient Greek kuanos meaning "dark-blue" with mitra meaning "head-band". The type species was designated by George Robert Gray in 1855 as Certhia cyanocephala Shaw.  This taxon is now considered to be a subspecies of the green-headed sunbird (Cyanomitra verticalis cyanocephala'''').

Species
The genus contains 7 species:

References 

Barlow, Wacher and Disley, Birds of The Gambia''

External links
 
 

 
Bird genera
Taxa named by Ludwig Reichenbach